Lowenstein or Loewenstein may refer to:

 Lowenstein (surname), including a list of people with the name
 Löwenstein, a city in Baden-Württemberg, Germany.
 Löwenstein-Wertheim, former state of the Holy Roman Empire 
 Alfred Lowenstein, Investor, Financer

See also
 Levenstein, a surname
 Lewenstein, a surname
 Lowenstein Sandler, a New Jersey law firm
 Löwenstein–Jensen medium, a growth medium more commonly known as LJ medium